The Suin Line (水仁線, Suijin-sen) was a  narrow gauge railway line of the Chōsen Railway (Chōtetsu) of colonial-era Korea, located in Gyeonggi Province.

History
The privately owned Chōsen Gyeongdong Railway was granted a licence to build a second railway line to haul salt from Sorae. Starting at Suwon, terminus of the railway's Suryeo Line, a   line was built to Incheon Port via Sorae, and was opened for operation on 5 August 1937. On 26 October 1942, the Chōsen Gyeongdong Railway was acquired by the Chōsen Railway, which continued operating the line until the end of the Pacific War.

Following the partition of Korea and the establishment of the Republic of Korea, on 17 May 1946 Chōtetsu, along with all other railways in the country, was nationalised, and the new Korean National Railroad took over operation of the Suin Line.

Services
In the November 1942 timetable, the last issued prior to the start of the Pacific War, Chōtetsu operated four daily, third-class-only local passenger trains:

Route

References

Rail transport in South Korea
Rail transport in Korea
Korea under Japanese rule
Defunct railway companies of Japan
Defunct railway companies of Korea
Chosen Railway